Marengo is an unincorporated census-designated place located in the town of White River, Ashland County, Wisconsin, United States. Marengo had a post office, which closed on June 27, 2009. At the 2010 census, its population was 111. Bus service to the community is provided by Bay Area Rural Transit.

References

Census-designated places in Ashland County, Wisconsin
Census-designated places in Wisconsin